Stepan Molokutsko (18 August 1979 – 5 October 2002) was a Ukrainian footballer who played for Illichivets Mariupol.

Death
He died in a road accident on 5 October 2002 near Novotroitske while driving on the way to Mariupol.

References

External links

1979 births
2002 deaths
Ukrainian footballers
Ukrainian Premier League players
Ukrainian First League players
Ukrainian Second League players
FC Mariupol players
FC Shakhtar Makiivka players
FC Illichivets-2 Mariupol players
Road incident deaths in Ukraine
Association football forwards
Sportspeople from Mariupol